The Office Manager is a 1931 German comedy film directed by Hans Behrendt and starring Felix Bressart, Hermann Thimig and Maria Meissner.

The film's sets were designed by the art director Jacek Rotmil.

Cast

References

Bibliography

External links 
 

1931 comedy films
German comedy films
1931 films
Films of the Weimar Republic
1930s German-language films
Films directed by Hans Behrendt
German black-and-white films
Films scored by Hans J. Salter
1930s German films